Yannick Noah was the defending champion, but lost in the quarterfinals to tournament winner Juan Aguilera.

Aguilera won the title by defeating Henrik Sundström 6–4, 2–6, 2–6, 6–4, 6–4 in the final.

Seeds
The first eight seeds received a bye into the second round.

Draw

Finals

Top half

Section 1

Section 2

Bottom half

Section 3

Section 4

References

External links
 Official results archive (ATP)
 Official results archive (ITF)

1984 Grand Prix (tennis)